The VEF JDA-10M was a Latvian twin-engine, multipurpose aircraft built in 1939 by VEF. It remains the only twin-engine aircraft ever built in Latvia. The builder of JDA-10M was Latvian-American engineer Jānis Akermanis (John D. Akerman),  a professor at the University of Minnesota.

Design and development
Construction started in 1937, but the first flight of the JDA-10M was on September 4, 1939. After the beginning of the Second World War it was planned to transform the airplane into a light bomber for military purposes. This work was halted by the Soviet occupation of Latvia in June 1940. Only one example was built, and its fate remains unknown.

The VEF JDA-10M was of primarily wood construction, with fixed conventional landing gear.

Specifications (JDA-10M)

See also

References 

1930s Latvian military aircraft
Low-wing aircraft
Twin piston-engined tractor aircraft
VEF aircraft